The Liga 3 is the third-level football league in the Portuguese football league system, starting in 2021–22. It is a professional national league organized by the Portuguese Football Federation (FPF).

The creation of this league is part of a restructuring of the Portuguese third tier, with Campeonato de Portugal, which saw the number of teams reduced, being relegated to fourth tier and the top teams competing there advancing to this new competition. In its first season, a total of 24 teams competed in the Liga 3, 2 of which were relegated from 2020–21 Liga Portugal 2 and 22 others which were promoted from 2020–21 Campeonato de Portugal. This number is set to be reduced to 20 teams for the 2023–24 season.

Format
This competition consists of a first stage with all the teams then proceed to a promotion or relegation series depending on their performance.

First Stage

In the first stage, the 24 clubs are divided in two series (Serie A and B) of 12 teams, according to geographic criteria. In each series, teams play against each other in a home-and-away double round-robin system. The four best-placed teams of the two series will advance to the promotion series and bottom 8 teams will proceed to the relegation series.

Promotion Stage

The eight qualified teams are divided in two series of 4 teams, playing against each other in a home-and-away double round-robin system. The winners of each series will be automatically promoted to Liga Portugal 2 and will face each other in a neutral venue to determine the champion. The second best placed teams will face each other in a playoff, whose winner will face the 16th placed of Liga Portugal 2 for the last spot in Liga Portugal 2. On this stage teams will be divided as follows.

Relegation Stage

The bottom 8 teams are divided in four series of 4 teams, playing against each other in a home-and-away double round-robin system. To account for their performance in the first stage, teams will start with bonification points, with 5th placed teams starting with 8 points and 12th placed teams starting with 1. The bottom teams of each series will be relegated to Campeonato de Portugal.

Seasons - league tables

List of champions

Performance by club

See also
Portuguese Third Division, third tier of Portuguese football between 1948 and 1990
Portuguese Second Division, third tier of Portuguese football between 1990 and 2013

References

External links
 FPF official webpage 
 Próxima Jornada 

3
Recurring sporting events established in 2021
Port
Professional sports leagues in Portugal
2021 establishments in Portugal